Hăsnășenii may refer to one of two places in Moldova:

Hăsnășenii Mari, a commune in Drochia district
Hăsnășenii Noi, a commune in Drochia district